Rodulf may refer to:
Rodulf (petty king), 5th-century ruler of the Ranii tribe
Rodulf (archbishop of Bourges), Frankish prelate and saint who died 866
Rodulf Haraldsson, Viking leader who died in 873
Rodulfus Glaber, chronicler who died 1047
Rodulf (missionary bishop), abbot of Abingdon (1051–52)
Rodulf of Ivry, Norman nobleman
Rudolf of St Trond or Rodulf (died 1138), abbot and composer
Rodulff or Rodulf, possibly legendary 12th-century Finnish bishop
Rodulf II de Warenne, Norman nobleman

See also
 Rudolph (disambiguation)